Mary Carillo (born March 15, 1957) is an American sportscaster and former professional tennis player. She is an analyst for Tennis on NBC and a reporter for NBC Olympic broadcasts.

Career

Tennis
Carillo played on the women's professional tennis circuit from 1977 to 1980. Her highest world rank was No. 33 in the Women's Tennis Association Rankings from January through March 1980. She then retired, citing knee injuries.

Carillo never won a major singles title, but did win the 1977 French Open mixed-doubles title with John McEnroe. Carillo and McEnroe made it to the quarterfinals at Wimbledon before being defeated, and later that year Carillo was a women's doubles quarterfinalist at the US Open.

WTA Tour finals
Doubles 1

Mixed doubles 1

Sportscasting

Tennis coverage
Carillo began her television career working for USA Network from 1980 to 1987, PBS from 1981 to 1986 and MSG from 1981 to 1988. She then worked for ESPN from 1988 to 1997 and again from 2003 to 2010. She also worked on US Open coverage for CBS Sports from 1986 to 2014. In addition, Carillo worked as both a host and analyst on HBO's Wimbledon coverage from 1996 to 1999, and on Turner Sports' Wimbledon coverage from 2000 to 2002. In May 2003, Carillo joined NBC Sports as an analyst on its French Open and Wimbledon coverage, having made her debut as an analyst on NBC for the 1996 Family Circle Cup tennis event. She also does commentary on The Tennis Channel.

Carillo's candid and insightful commentary has earned her accolades throughout the industry, including the distinction of being called "the sport's top analyst" by Sports Illustrated. She is known for her deep voice, quick wit and pointed sense of humor. Like her longtime friend and fellow Douglaston, Queens, New York native John McEnroe, Carillo is known for her colorful turns of phrase, and is credited with coining "Big Babe Tennis" to describe the era in women's tennis dominated by large, powerful players such as Lindsay Davenport, Serena Williams and Venus Williams. Carillo's unabashed and opinionated style of commentary has drawn criticism from several top players, notably Andre Agassi, Serena and Venus Williams, and Maria Sharapova. Nevertheless, she was named Best Commentator by Tennis Magazine (1988–91), Best Commentator by World Tennis magazine (1986) and Broadcaster of the Year by the Women's Tennis Association (1981 and 1985).

Olympic coverage
Carillo served as Olympic tennis analyst at both the Atlanta and Sydney Summer Olympics and as the skiing reporter for CBS's coverage at the Albertville, Lillehammer and Nagano Winter Olympics.

During NBC's coverage of the 2002 Salt Lake Winter Olympics she covered bobsled, luge and skeleton competitions. Her comment that men's doubles luge is "like a bar bet gone bad" was recognized as "line of the year" in many sports television columns. In addition, Carillo's work co-hosting the 2002 Closing Ceremony alongside Dan Hicks earned her critical acclaim.

At the 2004 Athens Games, Carillo earned critical praise in her debut as a full-time Olympic host on Bravo's coverage in addition to anchoring USA Network's live, Grand Slam-style coverage of the tennis gold medal finals. She delivered a lengthy, well-received commentary on badminton during this coverage.

At the 2006 Winter Games in Torino Carillo hosted Olympic Ice, a daily figure skating show on the USA Network. She co-hosted the daily figure-skating television program with Scott Hamilton, Dick Button, and Jamie Salé and David Pelletier.

Carillo served as late-night show host, closing ceremony host, and "Friend of Bob" for the 2008 Beijing Games, her ninth Olympic assignment and sixth with NBC. Her role focused on cultural commentary and "slice of life" pieces about China.  She repeated these duties—late-night host and human-interest reporter—for NBC's coverage of the 2010 Winter Olympics in Vancouver, the 2012 Summer Olympics in London, and the 2014 Winter Olympics in Sochi. She was also one of the torch bearers during the torch's tour through Canada.

Other activities
Since 1997, Carillo has been a correspondent on HBO's Real Sports with Bryant Gumbel, winning a Sports Emmy Award for her Real Sports feature on the Hoyt Family.

In 2009, 2013, and 2016, she co-hosted the 133rd, 137th and 140th Westminster Kennel Club Dog Show broadcast on USA Networks.

Carillo is a commentator for the Hallmark Channel special Paw Star Game premiering July 12, 2015. "At best, baby cats have the barest, most rudimentary grasp of the rules and regulations of American football and baseball," said Carillo. "And that's really okay with me. Frankly, watching kittens play any sport is going to be endearing and adorable." Carillo is also a commentator for Hallmark's Kitten Bowl.

Bibliography
Carillo has written three books, all related to tennis:

 Tennis My Way (1984), for which she is second author to Martina Navratilova
 Rick Elstein's Tennis Kinetics: With Martina Navratilova (1985), for which she is uncredited
 Tennis Confidential II: More of Today's Greatest Players, Matches, and Controversies (2008), for which she is second author to Paul Fein

Filmography
Carillo appeared as herself in the romantic-comedy film Wimbledon (2004).

Board membership
 She is a former member of the Women's Tennis Association's Board of Directors.
 In 2010, she was named President of USTA Serves - Foundation for Academics, Character and Excellence

Awards and honors

 Twice named Broadcaster of the Year by the Women's Tennis Association (1981, 1985)
 Named "Best Commentator" by World Tennis Magazine (1986), Toronto Star (1986) and Tennis magazine (1988–91)
 2008 inductee to National Italian American Sports Hall of Fame.
 Carillo received two Peabody Awards for co-writing, with Frank Deford, the HBO documentary Dare to Compete: The Struggle of Women in Sport, as well as a Billie Jean King documentary.
 Won a Sports Emmy Award for her feature on the Hoyt family
 Won the 2010 Dick Schaap Award for Outstanding Journalism first female recipient of the award
 Won the ITF's 2015 Philippee Chatrier Award, for her outstanding contribution to tennis.
 Won a 2016 (Annalee) Thurston Award, for her storied sportscasting career.
 Won 2017 Eugene L. Scott Award by the International Tennis Hall of Fame
 2018 inducted into Sports Broadcasting Hall of Fame

Personal life
Carillo was born in New York City in the borough of Brooklyn. She now splits her time between Naples, Florida and New York City's Greenwich Village. She was married for 15 years to tennis instructor Bill Bowden. They have two children and divorced in 1998.

References

External links

 
 
 
 

1957 births
20th-century American women writers

21st-century American women writers
American female tennis players
American writers of Italian descent
American television reporters and correspondents
American television sports announcers

Figure skating commentators
French Open champions
Living people
Peabody Award winners
Olympic Games broadcasters
People from Greenwich Village
Sportspeople from Naples, Florida
Sports Emmy Award winners
Sportspeople from Manhattan
Sportspeople from Queens, New York
Sportswriters from Florida
Sportswriters from New York (state)
Tennis commentators
Tennis people from Florida
Tennis people from New York (state)
Women sports announcers
Women's college basketball announcers in the United States
Grand Slam (tennis) champions in mixed doubles
Writers from Florida
Women sportswriters
Writers from Manhattan
American women non-fiction writers
20th-century American non-fiction writers
21st-century American non-fiction writers
American women television journalists
Women sports commentators